Illuminations: Stories is a 2022 short story collection by Alan Moore.

Contents 
 "Hypothetical Lizard"
 "Not Even Legend"
 "Location, Location, Location"
 "Cold Reading"
 "The Improbably Complex High-Energy State"
 "Illuminations"
 "What We Can Know About Thunderman"
 "American Light: An Appreciation"
 "And, at the Last, Just to Be Done with Silence"

References

External links 

 

2022 short story collections
English-language books
Bloomsbury Publishing books
Books by Alan Moore